The Battle of Párkány was a battle fought between October 7–9, 1683 in the town of Párkány (today: Štúrovo), in the Ottoman Empire, and the area surrounding it as part of the Polish-Ottoman War and the Great Turkish War. The battle was fought in two stages. In the first stage Polish troops under John III Sobieski were defeated by the Ottoman army under Kara Mehmed Pasha on October 7, 1683. In the second stage Sobieski, supported by Austrian forces under Charles V, Duke of Lorraine, defeated the Ottoman forces, which were supported by the troops of Imre Thököly, and gained control of Párkány on October 9, 1683. After the Ottoman defeat, the Austrians would besiege Esztergom and captured it at the end of 1683.

Prelude to battle 
On May 1, 1683, the Ottoman Empire attacked the Holy Roman Empire and besieged Vienna on July 14, 1683. On September 6 the Polish army under John III Sobieski arrived in Tulln and united with Imperial forces and additional troops from Saxony, Bavaria, Baden, Franconia and Swabia who had answered the call for a Holy League that was supported by Pope Innocent XI.

The Ottoman army, totaling around 150,000 men under Kara Mustafa Pasha, was defeated on September 11, 1683. The main part of the Ottoman forces retreated to the Balkans. A part of the Ottoman army under Kara Mehmed Pasha encamped in Párkány, Hungary, where they were supported by Imre Thököly, a local ruler.  Polish forces under Sobieski followed the Ottoman troops to Párkány to destroy them as they retreated.

Battle

First stage
On October 6, 1683, the Polish army reached the environs of Párkány. The army commanders advised caution, suggesting the advanced guards should rest for a day. Instead, Sobieski decided to surprise the Ottoman army by attacking it with his cavalry. On October 7, 1683, a Polish force of around 5,000 under Sobieski advanced in a rather disorganized manner towards the Ottoman positions. A Polish dragoon regiment under Stefan Bidziński was leading the advance. Suddenly a mass of Ottoman cavalry surged forward to attack them. The dragoon regiment was caught completely by surprise—it did not even have the match-cords of its muskets lit—and was quickly overwhelmed. The surviving dragoons fled back in panic into Sobieski's main force, closely followed by the Turkish horse, and forced the Poles to beat a hasty retreat to the safety of the Imperial army, which was following several kilometers behind. The Polish army lost around 1,000 soldiers; only the intervention of the Imperial cavalry prevented the Ottoman troops from causing far heavier losses.

Second stage of battle 
On October 8, 1683, Imperial reinforcements totaling 16,700 troops under Charles V, Duke of Lorraine joined the Polish army. After defeating the Polish cavalry, Kara Mehmed Pasha was sent 8,000 elite cavalrymen by Kara Mustafa Pasha. The troops of Imre Thököly were waiting for attack orders on the outskirts of Párkány. On October 9, 1683, the Imperial Army formed three lines. In the center of the lines were positioned 7,600 infantrymen under Ernst Rüdiger von Starhemberg. The Polish army was positioned on the wings. Sobieski led the right wing and Stanisław Jan Jabłonowski the left  On the right side of the lines 4,500 German cavalry under Ludwig Wilhelm, Margrave of Baden-Baden were positioned. On the left side of the lines 4,500 cavalry were positioned under Johann von Dünewald. The Ottoman forces attacked the first line of the Imperial army unsuccessfully and were flanked by the Polish cavalry. The Ottoman forces were defeated and lost about 9,000 men during the battle.

Aftermath 
After defeating the Ottomans in Párkány, the imperial forces continued their march and inflicted several more defeats on the Ottomans, while gaining control of Ottoman territories in Hungary. Kara Mustafa Pasha was executed by the sultan for failing to defend the Hungarian territories of the Ottoman Empire.

References 

Parkany
Parkany
Ottoman period in Hungary
Ottoman period in Slovakia
Párkány
Parkany
1683 in Europe
Párkány
1683 in the Ottoman Empire
1683 in the Habsburg monarchy